In the study of stochastic processes in mathematics, a disorder problem or quickest detection problem (formulated by Kolmogorov) is the problem of using ongoing observations of a stochastic process to detect as soon as possible when the probabilistic properties of the process have changed. This is a type of change detection problem.

An example case is to detect the change in the drift parameter of a Wiener process.

See also
Compound Poisson process

Notes

References
 
 
 
 Kolmogorov, A. N., Prokhorov, Yu. V. and Shiryaev, A. N. (1990). Methods of detecting spontaneously occurring effects. Proc. Steklov Inst. Math. 1, 1–21.

Stochastic processes
Optimal decisions